Saparmyrat Nyýazow (1940–2006), known as Türkmenbaşy, was the dictator of Turkmenistan from 1985 to 2006. He coined the title for himself.

Türkmenbaşy may also refer to:

Places
 Türkmenbaşy, Turkmenistan, a city formerly known as Krasnovodsk
 Türkmenbaşy District, a district of Balkan Province in Turkmenistan
 Türkmenbaşy Gulf, a bay of the Caspian Sea in the coast of Turkmenistan
 Türkmenbaşy şäherçesi, previously called Janga, a town and the administrative center of Türkmenbaşy District, Turkmenistan

Other uses
 Turkmenbashi International Airport, the airport serving the city of Türkmenbaşy, Turkmenistan
 Turkmenbashi International Seaport, the main passenger harbour and cargo port in Türkmenbaşy, Turkmenistan
 Türkmenbaşı Nature Park, a protected area in Istanbul, Turkey
 Türkmenbaşı Palace, former presidential palace of Turkmenistan
 Türkmenbaşy Ruhy Mosque, a mosque in Gypjak neighborhood of Ashgabat, Turkmenistan
 Türkmenbaşy Stadium or Shagadam Stadium, a football stadium in Türkmenbaşy, Turkmenistan

See also
 
 Turkmen people, a Turkic ethnic group native to Central Asia
 Turkmenistan, a country in Central Asia
 2002 renaming of Turkmen months and days of week, a law renaming all months and most days of the week with symbols chosen by Saparmurat Niyazov
 Humanitarian Association of World Turkmens, an association founded by Saparmurat Niyazov in 1991
 Main Drama Theater (Ashgabat), formerly named Türkmenistanyň Beýik Saparmyrat Türkmenbaşy adyndaky Baş drama teatry
 Military Institute of the Ministry of Defense of Turkmenistan, or Beýik Saparmyrat Türkmenbaşy adyndaky Türkmenistanyň Goranmak ministrliginiň Harby instituty

Titles held only by one person